Jang Gil-hyeok (born May 30, 1987) is a South Korean football player.

References

External links

profile at Goal
profile at Thaisoccernet

1987 births
Living people
South Korean footballers
South Korean expatriate footballers
Expatriate footballers in Thailand
South Korean expatriate sportspeople in Thailand
Association football fullbacks
Jang Gil-hyeok